The Women's 500 m time trial  was held on 18 October 2014.

Results

References

Women's 500 m time trial
European Track Championships – Women's 500 m time trial